Between 1757 and 1762, at the height of the Seven Years' War, the Pitt–Newcastle ministry governed the Kingdom of Great Britain. It was headed by Thomas Pelham-Holles, 1st Duke of Newcastle, serving in his second stint as prime minister. The most influential and famous minister, however, was William Pitt the Elder, Secretary of State.

History
The ministry ended a period of political instability in which Great Britain had struggled in the war. Pitt was a strong war leader but lacked the support in Parliament necessary to provide effective leadership. Newcastle provided this, as he had a solid support base in the House of Commons. They divided duties between each other; Pitt directed the defence and foreign policies, while Newcastle controlled the nation's finances and patronage.

The ministry led Britain to many victories in the war, particularly in the so-called Annus Mirabilis of 1759, which put the country in a strong position by 1761; that year, however, Pitt resigned over a dispute concerning the entry of Spain into the war. Since King George II died in 1760, the ministry had been under pressure by the accession of George III, who disliked both Pitt and Newcastle and favoured John Stuart, 3rd Earl of Bute. Bute, a Tory, was made Northern Secretary in March 1761, and following Pitt's resignation, the ministry is otherwise referred to as the Bute–Newcastle coalition.

In 1762 Newcastle was forced to resign, with his followers (the "Pelhamites") dismissed by Bute in what became known as the "Massacre of the Pelhamite Innocents"; this is traditionally considered to have been the moment the ministry collapsed.

Ministry
It is unclear who was a member of the Cabinet.

See also
 11th Parliament of Great Britain
 1761 British general election
 Great Britain in the Seven Years' War
 Whigs (British political party)

Notes

References

 
 
 
 
 
 
 
 

British ministries
Government
1757 establishments in Great Britain
1762 disestablishments in Great Britain
1750s in Great Britain
1760s in Great Britain
Ministries of George II of Great Britain
Ministries of George III of the United Kingdom